The Wulpura were an indigenous Australian people of the state of Queensland.
Their language, Kuku Waldja, has been listed as a dialect of Kuku Yalanji, but there does not appear to be any data available.

Country
They lived in the rainforested main range that lies west of Mount Romeo and Boolbun, and around the headwaters of the Daintree River on the Mount Windsor tableland.

People
According to one informant, the Wulpura were a people of relatively diminutive stature, on an average about 5 feet tall and weighing around 100 pounds. They engaged in an annual walkabout that would take them from South Mossman, via Julatten, and the Carbine River as far as the Daintree River, and before returning to their point of departure.

Alternative names
 Koko-baldja.(language name)
 Kokowaldja
 Waldja
 Walpoll
 Wolpa. (toponym)
 Woora. (toponym for a site on the South Mossman River)
 Wulpurara, Wulbur-ara
 Wulurara

Source:

Citations

Sources

Aboriginal peoples of Queensland